The Torist is a literary journal first released in late 2015, published on the Tor anonymity network. It features short stories, essays and poetry. One of the reasons for publishing on Tor was to return to the idea of rummaging through antiquarian shops – "It gets back to the time when you had to find The Evergreen Review in the stacks at the vintage bookstore" – and the zine can only be accessed through Tor, a dark web site. Its founders are the pseudonymous G.M.H., named after the reclusive 19th-century poet Gerard Manley Hopkins, and Prof. Robert W. Gehl, who is a communication professor focusing on new media at the University of Utah. The two met on the dark-net social network Galaxy, and started collaborating in 2014, taking two years to produce the first issue of the journal. Submissions are made through the anonymous and open-source GlobaLeaks platform — intended for whistleblowing. The founders hope this anonymity can bolster creativity among submissions, and wish to show that anonymity online isn't only for illicit activities.

Entries in the first issue were all named, including acclaimed poet Alissa Quart as well as other authors such as: Vance Osterhout, Linda Kronman, Andreas Zingerle, Nathanel Bassett, Peter Conlin, and JM Porup.

The entries have also gravitated towards issues concerning the modern internet, such as: prolific advertising, surveillance, censorship, and Edward Snowden.  entries are being accepted for the second edition of the magazine/journal, on a non-paid basis, but now allowing also anonymous entries. All content in The Torist is published under a Creative Commons license.

References

External links 
 Tumblr blog

Literary magazines published in the United States
Online magazines published in the United States
Magazines established in 2015
Tor onion services